The von KleinSmid Mansion was built for the von KleinSmid family of the DeKalb County city of Sandwich, Illinois in the mid-nineteenth century. It was added to the National Register of Historic Places in 1985. The building is located on Sandwich's West Center Street, and is under private ownership.

It was the childhood home of Rufus B. von KleinSmid, former President and Chancellor of the University of Southern California, and a passionate supporter of eugenics.

References

Houses in DeKalb County, Illinois
Houses on the National Register of Historic Places in Illinois
National Register of Historic Places in DeKalb County, Illinois
Sandwich, Illinois